The women's 800 metres at the 1958 European Athletics Championships was held in Stockholm, Sweden, at Stockholms Olympiastadion on 22 and 24 August 1958.

Medalists

Results

Final
24 August

Heats
22 August

Heat 1

Heat 2

Heat 3

Participation
According to an unofficial count, 19 athletes from 11 countries participated in the event.

 (1)
 (1)
 (2)
 (1)
 (1)
 (2)
 (3)
 (1)
 (3)
 (3)
 (1)

References

800 metres
800 metres at the European Athletics Championships
Euro